Thomas Pirker (born 17 January 1987) is an Austrian football defender playing for WAC St. Andrä.

Career
Until the end of 2008 he was with SK Austria Kärnten, for whom he played 12 matches in the Austrian Football Bundesliga and played than a half year for 1. FC Vöcklabruck.

References

1987 births
Living people
People from Spittal an der Drau
Austrian footballers
Austria youth international footballers
FC Kärnten players
Austrian Football Bundesliga players
Association football defenders
Footballers from Carinthia (state)